Buridan's Donkey (French: L'âne de Buridan) is a 1932 French comedy film directed by Alexandre Ryder and starring René Lefèvre, Colette Darfeuil and Mona Goya. It takes its title from the fable of Buridan's donkey.

The film's art direction was by Guy de Gastyne.

Cast
 René Lefèvre as Georges  
 Colette Darfeuil as Vivette  
 Mona Goya as Micheline  
 Charles Prince as Adolphe  
 Simone Deguyse as Fernande 
 Mauricet as Lucien  
 Francine Mussey as Odette  
 Alexandre Mihalesco as Le photographe  
 Jean Bara as Un petit garçon 
 Jeanne Bernard 
 Olga Lord
 Maximilienne

References

Bibliography 
 Crisp, Colin. Genre, Myth and Convention in the French Cinema, 1929-1939. Indiana University Press, 2002.

External links 
 

1932 films
1932 comedy films
French comedy films
1930s French-language films
French films based on plays
Pathé films
Films directed by Alexandre Ryder
French black-and-white films
1930s French films